Tamar Haspel is an American columnist who "writes on the intersection of food and science" for The Washington Post. Her column "Unearthed" has twice been nominated for the James Beard Foundation Award, which she won in 2015. Her piece "How to get people to cook more? Get eaters to complain less" was anthologized in The Best Food Writing 2015. She is the author of the 2022 boko To Boldly Grow about the pleasures and perils of growing, killing and harvesting your own food.

She is a big fan of oats.

References

Living people
Writers from Massachusetts
The Washington Post people
American columnists
American food writers
Year of birth missing (living people)